is a passenger railway station in located in the city of Ise, Mie Prefecture, Japan, operated by Central Japan Railway Company (JR Tōkai).

Lines
Isuzugaoka Station is served by the Sangū Line, and is located 17.9 rail kilometers from the terminus of the line at Taki Station.

Station layout
The station consists of one side platform serving a single bi-directional traffic. There is no station building, and the station is unattended.

Platforms

Adjacent stations

|-

History
Isuzugaoka Station opened on April 1, 1963 as a station on the Japan National Railways (JNR) Sangū Line. The station was absorbed into the JR Central network upon the privatization of the JNR on April 1, 1987.

Passenger statistics
In fiscal 2019, the station was used by an average of 252 passengers daily (boarding passengers only).

Surrounding area
Ujiyamada Commercial High School
Ise Women's High School
Kuratayama Park

See also
List of railway stations in Japan

References

External links

Railway stations in Japan opened in 1963
Railway stations in Mie Prefecture
Ise, Mie